David Macpherson and Scott Melville were the defending champions, but competed this year with different partners. Macpherson teamed up with Steve DeVries and lost in the quarterfinals to Tom Nijssen and Cyril Suk, while Melville teamed up with Emilio Sánchez and lost in the first round to Hendrik Jan Davids and Piet Norval.

Javier Sánchez and Mark Woodforde won the title by defeating Hendrik Jan Davids and Piet Norval 7–5, 6–3 in the final.

Seeds

Draw

Draw

References

External links
 Official results archive (ATP)
 Official results archive (ITF)

Nice